The 1913 Lehigh Brown and White football team was an American football team that represented Lehigh University as an independent during the 1913 college football season. In its second season under head coach Tom Keady, the team compiled a 5–3 record and outscored opponents by a total of 152 to 100.

Schedule

References

Lehigh
Lehigh Mountain Hawks football seasons
Lehigh football